Hawklaw Y Station was a Government listening station located north of Cupar in Fife which operated between 1942 and 1988.

History
The building was built with windows in the Art Deco style and completed by 1942. During the Second World War it operated as a Y-station collecting information for analysts at Bletchley Park. Unlike other Y stations Hawklaw did not close after the War but continued as a Cold War monitoring station under the aegis of Government Communications Headquarters until it closed in 1988.

References

Buildings and structures in Fife
Buildings at Risk Register for Scotland
World War II sites in Scotland
1942 establishments in Scotland
1988 disestablishments in Scotland
Y service